Timo Airaksinen (born 25 April 1947 in Vaasa, Finland) is Professor of Moral Philosophy in the Discipline of Social and Moral Philosophy at Helsinki University. By longstanding tradition in the University of Helsinki, the philosophy faculty is divided into two major areas, the practical and the theoretical. He graduated from the University of Turku in 1971 and defended his doctoral dissertation The Hegelianism of Bradley and McTaggart in 1975. He specializes in ethics and social philosophy, ethics of technology, the history of philosophy, and education. He has written on a wide range of topics dealing with these issues, from the thinking of Hobbes to Marquis de Sade. Airaksinen also regularly contributes to public debate in Finland and has had a column in the newspaper Helsingin Sanomat.

Timo Airaksinen is a member of the editorial boards of the leading Finnish philosophical journal Acta Philosophica Fennica and of the yearbook Berkeley Studies. Also he was the vice-president of the International Berkeley Society.

Selection of Airaksinen's works in English 

 Ethics of coercion and authority. A philosophical study of social life, 1988 .
 Of glamor, Sex and De Sade, 1991 .
 The Philosophy of the Marquis de Sade, 1995 .
 The Philosophy of H. P. Lovecraft. The route to horror, 1999 .
 "Hobbes on the passions and powerlessness", Hobbes Studies, 6/1993, pp. 80–104.
 "Service and Science in Professional Life", Ethics and the Professions, 1994, pp. 1–13

References

Atheist philosophers
Finnish atheists
Finnish philosophers
Academic staff of the University of Helsinki
1947 births
Living people
People from Vaasa
George Berkeley scholars
University of Turku alumni